Welcome Change Productions is an independent documentary production company founded in 1991 by filmmaker Alice Elliott. Their 2002 film The Collector of Bedford Street was nominated for an Academy Award in the short documentary category and won the Best Documentary, Horizon Award, and Audience Award at its world premier at the Aspen Shortsfest.

Welcome Change specializes in making films that focus on people with disabilities and communities that are reinventing themselves. Their mission is "to lead social change by revealing the big stories hidden in the human heart."

Welcome Change's upcoming film, Miracle on 42nd Street, is a feature-length documentary about the unique apartment complex called Manhattan Plaza located in Manhattan’s historic Theater District, a neighborhood also known as Hell’s Kitchen. Located on the block between 42nd and 43rd Streets, it is often called the “Miracle on 42nd Street” due to the near-miraculous effect the complex has had on the once-blighted neighborhood and on the lives of its residents. Seventy percent of the occupants work in the performing arts and thirty percent are Hell’s Kitchen residents who are elderly, disabled or have been relocated from substandard housing.

Alice Elliott 
Alice Elliott is an Academy Award® nominated director, a writer, producer, university level teacher, advocate for the disabled, cinematographer, and the recipient of 2012 John Simon Guggenheim Memorial Foundation Fellowship.  Alice is also a member of New Day Films, a 40-year-old educational film distribution cooperative.  Her short documentary, The Collector of Bedford Street, was nominated for an Academy Award® and aired on HBO/Cinemax. Alice Elliott was the director, co-producer, and the principal verite cinematographer on her latest film, Body & Soul: Diana & Kathy, which aired on PBS for National Disability Awareness Month. Recently she returned from screening Body & Soul: Diana & Kathy in Uzbekistan for the State Department through The American Documentary Showcase, sponsored by the University Film and Video Association. Alice is a full-time faculty member at New York University’s Tisch School of the Arts, and has been producing documentaries for almost twenty years.

Her writing includes the Nickelodeon series Are You Afraid of the Dark?. She co-authored The Tale of the Bookish Babysitter. With Cliff Bryant, she completed a screen play, HAT TRICK. A published and produced playwright of both adult and children’s plays, her work includes the book for Wide Awake Jake, co-authoring The Magic Fishbone with music and lyrics by Tom Chapin and Michael Mark. Her other plays, Willing to be Lucky and The Incredible Shrinking Family, premiered in New York City at the Joseph Campbell/Jean Erdman Open Eye: New Stagings series.

As a performer, she appeared on ABC’s daytime drama LOVING for ten years and made two feature films including Four Friends directed by Arthur Penn. For major publishers in New York, she has recorded English as a Second Language programs and was one of the speakers on the TOEFL English Standard audio tests. In addition she has produced or performed in over 200 commercials. She teaches a voice over class for NYU’s School of Continuing and Professional Studies, and coaches voice over clients, radio personalities, and public speakers.

She is a member of Actors Equity, American Federation of Radio and Television Artists, Screen Actors Guild, and New York Women in Film and Television (former board member and secretary).

The Collector of Bedford Street 
The Collector of Bedford Street is an Academy Award® nominated 34 minute documentary about Alice’s neighbor, Larry Selman. Every year, Larry collects thousands of dollars for charities while living at the poverty line. Larry is a community activist and a fundraiser who has an intellectual disability. When Larry’s Uncle Murray becomes unable to care for him, his New York City neighbors come together and establish an adult trust fund to ensure that he continues to live independently in his own apartment.

Body and Soul: Diana & Kathy 
Body & Soul: Diana & Kathy is a look at an unusual, symbiotic relationship between two people some would call profoundly disabled. Two of the country’s most remarkable advocates for people with disabilities, Diana Braun, who has Down Syndrome, and Kathy Conour, who has cerebral palsy, met three decades ago and vowed to fight to live independent lives. The film is a story of a compelling, creative friendship.

Upcoming Projects 

Callicoon Center Band

Two and a half hours from New York City lie the Catskill Mountains and rural Sullivan County. For the last seventy-five years, in the summer, for one hour on Wednesday nights, rain or shine, the Callicoon Center Band has been playing. The audience is mostly locals, because Wednesday night is not really convenient for the city people whose second homes dot the hills and lakes surrounding Callicoon Center. Also the music may not be quite to their taste. Polkas, Waltzes, and the hits of fifty years ago come blaring and bouncing out of the thirty member band.

Local music teachers, merchants, social workers, teens and retirees commit to ten weeks of rehearsal in the spring and ten performances over the summer. In this hour-long documentary, Academy Award nominated® director Alice Elliott celebrates music and community as the band rides the waves of change.

Miracle on 42nd Street

MIRACLE ON 42ND STREET is a feature-length documentary about the unique apartment complex called Manhattan Plaza located in Manhattan’s historic Theater District, a neighborhood also known as Hell’s Kitchen. Located on the block between 42nd and 43rd Streets, it is often called the “Miracle on 42nd Street” due to the near-miraculous effect the complex has had on the once-blighted neighborhood and on the lives of its residents. Seventy percent of the occupants work in the performing arts and thirty percent are Hell’s Kitchen residents who are elderly, disabled or have been relocated from substandard housing.

The film tells the story of how this innovative affordable housing experiment came to be, the artists it has nurtured, the close community its residents and management have created and the positive impact it has had on the economy of Manhattan’s West Side. The filmmakers, several of whom are current and former residents, are passionate about sharing the story of Manhattan Plaza with the world. It is a unique model of what can be achieved by bringing together over 3,500 people from differing cultural, ethnic and economic backgrounds.

References 
 NPR Stories

 AMC review

External links
  Welcome Change Productions
 New Day Films

Film production companies of the United States
Documentary film production companies